City Hall is a building in Southwark, London which previously served as the headquarters of the Greater London Authority (GLA) between July 2002 and December 2021. It is located in the London Borough of Southwark, on the south bank of the River Thames near Tower Bridge. In June 2020, the Greater London Authority started a consultation on proposals to vacate City Hall and move to The Crystal, a GLA-owned property in Newham, at the end of 2021. The decision was confirmed on 3 November 2020 and the GLA vacated City Hall on 2 December 2021.  The Southwark location is ultimately owned by the government of Kuwait.

History
City Hall was designed by Norman Foster and was constructed at a cost of £43 million on a site formerly occupied by wharves serving the Pool of London. It opened in July 2002, two years after the Greater London Authority was created, and was leased rather than owned by the Greater London Authority. Despite its name, City Hall is not in and does not serve a city (according to UK law), often adding to the confusion of Greater London with the City of London, which has its headquarters at Guildhall. In June 2011, Mayor Boris Johnson announced that for the duration of the London 2012 Olympic Games, the building would be called London House.

In November 2020, Mayor of London Sadiq Khan announced plans to vacate City Hall at the end of 2021 and relocate to The Crystal in the Royal Victoria Docks area of East London. Khan cited the high cost of rent as reasoning for relocating the Greater London Authority headquarters, stating that vacating the City Hall in favour of a property owned by the authority would save it £55 million over the course of five years.

Design

The building has an unusual, bulbous shape, purportedly intended to reduce its surface area and thus improve energy efficiency, although the excess energy consumption caused by the exclusive use of glass (in a double facade) overwhelms the benefit of shape.  Despite claiming the building "demonstrates the potential for a sustainable, virtually non-polluting public building", energy use measurements have shown this building to be fairly inefficient in terms of energy use (375 kWh/m2/yr), with a 2012 Display Energy Performance Certificate rating of "E". It has been compared variously to a helmet (either Darth Vader's or simply a motorcyclist's), a misshapen egg, and a woodlouse. Former mayor Ken Livingstone referred to it as a "glass testicle", while his successor, Boris Johnson, made the same comparison using a different word, "The Glass Gonad" and more politely as "The Onion".

A 500-metre (1,640 ft) helical walkway ascends the full ten storeys. At the top is an exhibition and meeting space with an open viewing deck that was occasionally open to the public. The walkway provides views of the interior of the building, and is intended to symbolise transparency; a similar device was used by Foster in his design for the rebuilt Reichstag (parliament), when Germany's capital was moved back to Berlin. In 2006 it was announced that photovoltaic cells would be fitted to the building by the London Climate Change Agency.

The debating chamber was located at the bottom of the helical stairway. The seats and desks for Assembly Members were arranged in a circular form.

Location
The building is located on the River Thames in the London Borough of Southwark, as part of the extended pedestrianised South Bank. It forms part of a larger development called More London, including offices and shops. The nearest London Underground and National Rail station is London Bridge.

In popular culture
In 2018, the final selection for the television show The Apprentice, was filmed in City Hall.

Gallery

See also
County Hall
Inclined building

References

External links 

 Greater London Authority – City Hall
 UCL CASA – Panorama of City Hall (requires QuickTime)

2002 establishments in England
Buildings and structures in the London Borough of Southwark
London
Government buildings completed in 2002
Greater London Authority
High-tech architecture
Inclined buildings
Lattice shell structures
Foster and Partners buildings
Neo-futurism architecture
Privately owned public spaces
Tourist attractions in the London Borough of Southwark